The Tau τ is a family of gasoline V8 engines produced by the Hyundai Motor Company. It replaced the Omega engine line.

Tau MPi

Specifications
4.6 Tau MPi for the Genesis' 4.6L Tau V8 engine:
 Displacement (bore x stroke): 
 Block material: High pressure die casting aluminum block
 Cylinder head material: Aluminum
 Valvetrain: Dual Over Head Cam (DOHC)
 Valve timing: Continuous variable valve timing
 Variable induction system
 Fuel delivery: Multi-port fuel injection
 Recommended fuel: Premium Unleaded, though it can run safely on regular gasoline with reduced performance

Application

4.6 Tau MPi
 2008–2009 Kia Mohave/Borrego
 2008–2012 Hyundai Genesis
 2009–2011 Hyundai Equus

Hyundai Motor Company has also shown a supercharged version of the 4.6 Tau MPi engine at 2008 SEMA show, and later 2009 Chicago Auto Show. This engine was equipped with a supercharger and cylinder deactivation technology to produce an estimated  while returning better fuel economy.

Tau GDi

First version (2012–2014) 
The Tau GDi uses gasoline direct injection.

Specifications
5.0 Tau GDi for Equus' 5.0L Tau V8 engine:
 Horsepower: 
 Torque: 
 Displacement (bore x stroke): 
 Compression ratio: 11.5:1
 Block material: High pressure die casting aluminum block
 Cylinder head material: Aluminum
 Valvetrain: Dual Over Head Cam (DOHC)
 Valve timing: Dual-Continuous variable valve timing(D-CVVT)
 Variable induction system
 Fuel delivery: Gasoline direct injection / Electronic fuel injection
 Recommended fuel: Premium Unleaded, though it can run safely on regular gasoline with reduced performance

Current version (2015–2021)

Updates to the 2015 Genesis 5.0 Tau V8 included: 
 Bump  in compression ratio from 11.5:1 to 11.8:1
 Optimized intake runner length
 Enhanced timing chain for reduced friction and NVH
 Low-torque exhaust manifold
 Upgraded multiple-injection mapping
 Dual Continuously Variable Valve Timing (D-CVVT), a tuned variable induction system, and low-friction coatings on piston skirts
 Improved Low-end response along with better efficiency and NVH

Application
 2016–2020 Genesis G80 (DH)
 2015–2021 Genesis G90 (HI)
 2011–2015 Hyundai Equus (VI)
 2011–2016 Hyundai Genesis
 2012–2021 Kia K9

Awards
The 4.6 Tau V8 Engine was named to the Wards 10 Best Engine Awards for 2009 and 2010. The Tau V8 received the award due to the engine's "velvety power delivery, competitive performance, and attainable price-- all of which epitomize the Korean auto maker's drive for world-class engineering", as quoted by Forbes. This was Hyundai Motor Co. Ltd. first appearance on Ward's 10 Best Engines list. The 5.0 Tau Engine was also named in the same awards for 2011.

See also
 List of Hyundai engines

References

Tau
V8 engines
Gasoline engines by model